The Mount Edziza volcanic complex is a large and potentially active north-south trending complex volcano in Stikine Country, northwestern British Columbia, Canada, located  southeast of the small community of Telegraph Creek. It occupies the southeastern portion of the Tahltan Highland, an upland area of plateau and lower mountain ranges, lying east of the Boundary Ranges and south of the Inklin River, which is the east fork of the Taku River. As a volcanic complex, it consists of many types of volcanoes, including shield volcanoes, calderas, lava domes, stratovolcanoes, and cinder cones.

Most of the Mount Edziza volcanic complex is encompassed within a large provincial park called Mount Edziza Provincial Park. Named after Mount Edziza, this  park was established in 1972 to preserve the volcanic and cultural treasures unique to the northern British Columbia area. The Mount Edziza volcanic complex is remote, and, without roads, accessible only along trails. The easiest access is from Highway 37 and a spur road from Dease Lake to Telegraph Creek. From Kinaskan Lake, on Highway 37, a poorly maintained trail extends west for  into the heart of the complex.

Geology

Origins

The Mount Edziza volcanic complex began forming about 7.5 million years ago and has grown steadily since then. Like other volcanoes in northwestern British Columbia, the Mount Edziza volcanic complex has its origins in continental rifting—a long divergent plate boundary where the lithosphere is being pulled apart. This incipient rifting has formed as a result of the Pacific Plate sliding northward along the Queen Charlotte Fault, on its way to the Aleutian Trench, which extends along the southern coastline of Alaska and the adjacent waters of northeastern Siberia off the coast of Kamchatka Peninsula. As the continental crust stretches, the  near-surface rocks fracture along steeply dipping cracks parallel to the rift known as faults. Hot basaltic magma rises along these fractures to create passive lava eruptions, known as effusive eruptions.

The rift zone has existed for at least 20 million years, and has created a line of volcanoes called the Northern Cordilleran Volcanic Province, also called the Stikine Volcanic Belt, stretching from the Alaska-Yukon border to near Prince Rupert, British Columbia.  Several presently dormant volcanoes in the province are potentially active, three of them having erupted in the last few hundred years, two witnessed by First Nations and placer miners during the 18th and 19th centuries. The Tseax Cone, which last erupted in the 18th century, is the southernmost historically active volcano in the province, while Prindle Volcano in easternmost-central Alaska, which erupted during the Pleistocene period, is generally considered the northernmost.

Structure

Four central volcanoes, known as Armadillo Peak, Spectrum Range, Ice Peak, and Mount Edziza, lie along the northerly trending axis of an oval, composite shield volcano. The composite shield volcano consists of overlapping shields, two of which are clearly noticeable on maps. More light-coloured magmas of mainly trachyte and comendite with very little aluminum are mainly confined to the four central volcanoes and associated lava dome. The lava plateau is flanked by Klastline River to the north, Mess Creek and larger Stikine River to the west and the Iskut River to the east. Three sections of the lava plateau have official names; these are the Arctic Lake, Big Raven, and Kitsu plateaus. The history of the Mount Edziza volcanic complex includes at least two periods of regional glaciation, when deep ice sheets covered the land, and several lesser advances of mountain glaciers.

Stratovolcano composition
The steep-sided, symmetrical stratovolcanoes in the region were built by repeated eruptions of thick, slow-moving lava that have commonly flowed only a few kilometres from the vent. Explosive eruptions are often associated with these volcanoes, depositing alternating layers of volcanic ash, cinders, blocks, and globes of molten rock called volcanic bombs or lava bombs, which are added to its slopes to create the stratovolcano. Edziza's stratovolcanoes contain a fine-grained silica-rich volcanic rock called trachyte; they have not erupted for thousands of years, allowing erosion to destroy the original cone, creating craggy ridges and rock outcrops of more resistant materials.

Caldera composition
Circular calderas in the Mount Edziza volcanic complex were formed as a result of emptying the magma chamber beneath a volcano. If enough magma is erupted, the emptied chamber will not be able to support the weight of the volcanic edifice above it. A roughly circular fracture— a "ring fault"— develops around the edge of the chamber. These ring fractures serve as feeders for fault intrusions that are also known as ring dikes. Secondary volcanic vents form above the ring fracture. As the magma chamber empties, the centre of the volcano within the ring fracture begins to collapse. The collapse may occur as the result of a single cataclysmic eruption, or it may occur in stages as the result of a series of eruptions. These caldera collapses are relatively small compared to most other caldera collapses. Volcanic eruptions accompanying these collapses produced trachyte and a white, sodic rhyolite called comendite.

Lava dome composition
Edziza's rounded, steep-sided lava domes were built by eruptions of very thick light-coloured magma, including trachyte. Such magmas are typically too thick to move far from the vent it extrudes from, causing it to solidify quickly and build on previous volcanic extrusions, creating a characteristic dome-like shape. The thickness of the magma is attributed to high levels of silica, a naturally occurring silicon dioxide found in various crystalline and amorphous forms. Edziza's domes reach heights of several hundred metres, and grew slowly and steadily for months to years. The sides of these structures are composed of unstable rock debris. Due to the possibility of the building of gas pressure, the dome can experience more explosive eruptions over time. When part of a lava dome collapses while it still contains molten rock and gases, it can produce a pyroclastic flow, a super-heated mix of gas, ash, and pumice.

Characteristics of lava dome eruptions include shallow, long-period and hybrid seismic activity, which is attributed to excess fluid pressures in the contributing vent chamber. Other characteristics of lava domes include their spherical dome shape, cycles of dome growth over long periods, and sudden onsets of violent explosive activity. The average rate of dome growth may be used as a rough indicator of magma supply, but it shows no systematic relationship to the timing or characteristic of lava dome explosions.

Cinder cone composition
The steep conical cinder cones of Edziza were formed by lava fountain eruptions, emitting particles and blobs of congealed lava from a single vent. As the gas-charged lava is blown violently into the air, it breaks into small fragments that solidify and fall as cinder around the vent to form a circular or oval cone. Edziza's cinder cones have bowl-shaped craters at their summits and rise more than a hundred metres above their surroundings. Cinder cones are widespread in British Columbia as well as throughout other volcanic terrains of the world.

Shield volcano composition
Edziza's shield volcanoes are built almost entirely of fluid lava flows. They formed as a result of lava flowing out in all directions from central summit vents and from groups of vents, building a broad, gently sloping cone of flat, domical shape. They are built up slowly by the accretion of thousands of lava flows of highly fluid basaltic lava, which spread widely over great distances, and then cool as thin, gently dipping sheets. In some shield volcano eruptions, basaltic lava has poured out quietly from fissure vents instead of central vents, flooding the surrounding countryside with lava flow upon lava flow, forming Edziza's broad lava plateau.

Lava plateaus similar to Edziza's can be found elsewhere in North America, including the Snake River Plain in Idaho, and the Columbia River Basalt Group in southeastern Washington, and eastern Oregon, United States; they can also be found in Iceland.

Subglacial mound composition
Subglacial mounds (SUGM) of the Mount Edziza volcanic complex are an unusual type of subglacial volcano formed when subglacial eruptions began melting overlying glacial ice at a time when this region was covered by glacial ice during the Pleistocene and early Holocene periods. These subglacial eruptions were not hot enough to melt a vertical pipe right through the overlying glacial ice, instead forming mounds of hydrated volcanic rock made up of volcanic fragments called hyaloclastite and lava that solidified into pillow-shaped masses called pillow lava deep beneath the glacial ice field. Once the glaciers had retreated, the subglacial volcanoes would be revealed, with a unique shape as a result of their confinement within glacial ice.

Eruptive history

The lava domes, calderas, stratovolcanoes, subglacial mounds and cinder cones forming the volcanic complex were constructed in five phases, each of which began with the effusion of dark olivine basalt which formed the flat-lying shield volcanoes and concluded with the eruption of light-coloured magma. This cyclical behavior is attributed to the episodic rise of basic, mantle-derived alkali basalt both to the surface and partly into crustal reservoirs where the light-coloured magmas with very little aluminum were created by prolonged crystal fractionation. The silica-rich trachyte and comendite lavas are similar to those associated with the most violent eruptions on Earth.

Armadillo Peak eruptive period
The first phase of activity resulted in the creation of Armadillo Peak seven million years ago, today represented by an eroded remnant of a small caldera flanked by steep-sided light-coloured secondary lava domes, including Cartoona Peak, Tadeda Peak, IGC Centre, and Sezill Volcano, and a thick pile of interlayered light-coloured lava flows, pyroclastic flows, air-fall pumice, and epiclastic deposits.

Spectrum Range eruptive period

A broad circular lava dome was eventually created called the Spectrum Range. Named for its extensive colourful alteration, it overlies a basal shield volcano and contains deeply carved circular valleys displaying portions of massive silica-rich comendite and trachyte lava flows which comprise the lava dome.

Ice Peak eruptive period

It is a stratovolcano that was constructed when large areas of the Edziza lava plateau were free from glacial ice and now enclosed by glacial deposits. However, additional parts of the Mount Edziza volcanic complex were likely still covered by glacial ice. The volcanic activity from Ice Peak during this period produced both basic and intermediate to light-coloured lava flows and pyroclastic rocks which mixed with meltwater to produce debris flows. As Ice Peak began to form, basic lava spread to the flanks of the cone where it formed meltwater lakes and combines with and forms part of the adjacent shield volcano. As lava continued to flow into these meltwater lakes, pillow lava and solidified rubble was created. Many of the lava flows with compositions of trachyte and basalt were however erupted just below the surface of the soil. Continuous volcanic activity eventually made Ice Peak reach an elevation of  when three viscous, intermediate, and light-coloured lava flows built up around secondary lava domes parallel with its western side during its final stage of activity 1,500,000 years ago and develops nearly all of the steep, higher flanks of the volcano. These viscous light-coloured lava flows are displayed at two cliffs with broad faces, known as Ornostay Bluff and Koosick Bluff and contain basic rock made of solidified rubble overlain by large fractured lava with massive, poorly established pillars.

Two cinder cones on Ice Peak's southern flank called Camp Hill and Cache Hill and possibly first erupted when glacial ice was still existing on the Edziza lava plateau. As lava flowed into the glacial ice above a vent, pools of meltwater were created. Continuous lava eruptions that flowed into the meltwater pools were cooled and fractured. This fragmental material was interrupted by explosions of steam, water, ash, rock, and volcanic bombs called phreatic eruptions. Camp Hill was eventually developed and over time it grew above water level inside the meltwater lake. Later eruptions produced a pyroclastic cone on top of the original fragmental cone. Cache Hill erupted when nearly all the glacial ice had retreated. The first lava flows from Cache Hill flowed through and dammed a river valley, which eventually ponded to produce a small lake. Subsequent lava flows traveled into the lake to produce pillow lava and solidified rubble. During the long period of Ice Peak activity, high-altitude glaciers developed and melted cutting valleys into the volcano. Near the end of Ice Peak activity 1,500,000 years ago, this high-altitude glacial ice combined with the regional ice forming part of the Cordilleran Ice Sheet. A small volume of intermediate lava was erupted from Ice Peak compared to the other central volcanoes.

Mount Edziza eruptive period

The fourth phase of activity began one million years ago when the Cordilleran Ice Sheet retreated from the upper flanks of the adjacent lava plateau, creating Mount Edziza proper which is the most northerly of the four central volcanoes. The stratovolcano is made up of a fine-grained volcanic rock called trachyte and is associated with several lava domes which were formed by trachyte lava flows and explosive eruptions. Its smooth northern and western flanks, only slightly channeled by erosion, curve up to a circular  summit ridge which surrounds a central, ice-filled caldera  in diameter. Many glaciers cover Mount Edziza proper, including the Tencho Glacier on its southern flank. Active cirques on the eastern flank have breached the caldera rim, exposing the remnants of numerous lava lakes which ponded in the caldera 900,000 years ago and rest on hydrothermally altered breccia of the main conduit. Piles of pillow lava and hyaloclastite, formed by subglacial eruptions, are found on the flanks of Mount Edziza and nearby Ice Peak, as well as on the surface of the surrounding shield volcano. Pillow Ridge on Edziza's northwest flank was formed when basaltic lava erupted beneath the regional Cordilleran Ice Sheet when it was close to its greatest thickness.

Central volcano flank eruptive period

The fifth and final phase of eruptive activity occurred from secondary volcanic vents along the flanks of the four central volcanoes starting 10,000 years ago. This phase of activity began at a time when remnants of glacial ice were still present and continued after the glacial period. The initial flank eruptions, quenched by glacial meltwater, formed hyaloclastite tuff rings, whereas later activity created 30 small cinder cones, primarily of basaltic composition, including Mess Lake Cone, Kana Cone, Cinder Cliff, Icefall Cone, Ridge Cone, Williams Cone, Walkout Creek Cone, Moraine Cone, Sidas Cone, Sleet Cone, Storm Cone, Triplex Cone, Twin Cone, Cache Hill, Camp Hill, Cocoa Crater, Coffee Crater, Nahta Cone, Tennena Cone, The Saucer and the well-preserved Eve Cone. These cinder cones were formed no earlier than the year 700 based on the age of burnt plant stems still rooted in former soil under  of loose basaltic fragments. These cinder cones were built on the basaltic fragments and blocky lava fields surrounding the cones. The Snowshoe lava field, on the southern end of the Big Raven Plateau, is one of the areas of young lava flows in the region while the Desolation lava field, on the northern end of the Big Raven Plateau, is the largest area of young lava flows, covering an area of 150 km2. This volcanic activity was followed by at least two younger, but still undated eruptions, including an undated air-fall pumice deposit.

The undated air-fall pumice deposit exists across the southwestern part of the Big Raven Plateau called Sheep Track Pumice or Sheep Track member. Pumice is a light volcanic rock full of air spaces and commonly pale in colour, ranging from white, cream, blue or grey, but can be green or black. The Sheep Track Pumice is mysterious because the vent of its origin is unknown, even though it is estimated from its state of preservation to be younger than 500 years. This pumice deposit emphasizes one of the significant volcanic hazards linked to the Mount Edziza volcanic complex – the likelihood of a violent explosive eruption. The volcano that produced the pumice might be covered by glacial ice. Collaborators at the University of British Columbia have started work on samples collected from deposits of Sheep Track Pumice.

Current activity

The Mount Edziza volcanic complex is one of the eleven Canadian volcanoes associated with recent seismic activity: the others are Castle Rock, Mount Garibaldi, Mount Cayley, Hoodoo Mountain, The Volcano, Crow Lagoon, Silverthrone Caldera, Mount Meager massif, Wells Gray-Clearwater volcanic field and Nazko Cone. Seismic data suggests that these volcanoes still contain live magma plumbing systems, indicating possible future eruptive activity. Although the available data does not allow a clear conclusion, these observations are further indications that some of Canada's volcanoes are potentially active, and that their associated hazards may be significant. The seismic activity correlates both with some of Canada's most youthful volcanoes, and with long-lived volcanic centres with a history of significant explosive behavior, such as the Mount Edziza volcanic complex.

The most recent volcanic activity at the Mount Edziza volcanic complex have been hot springs, several of which are found on the volcano's western flank, including Elwyn springs (36°C or 97°F), Taweh springs (46 °C or 115 °F), and inactive springs near Mess Lake. The springs are near the youngest lava fields of the Mount Edziza volcanic complex and are most likely associated with the most recent eruptive activity. These hot springs were highly important to the adjacent Tahltan people.

Hot springs are closely associated with fumaroles, which are vents in an active volcanic area releasing steam and hot gases, such as sulfur dioxide. In general, the water is rotating groundwater that comes into contact with rocks heated by magma and finds openings to the surface. The formation of the springs depends both on the rocks the water has passed through and the profusion of volcanic discharges mixed with the groundwater. Iron oxide, iron sulfides and other substances usually colour pools of boiling mud brilliant yellow, red, brown or green. Hot springs comprising significantly softened silica may deposit it to form siliceous sinter, whereas those comprising softened calcium carbonate deposit spongy-looking calcareous rock called tufa. Overflow of the springs can build masses, spires or stepped terraces of calcareous sinter or tufa.

Human history

Indigenous people
As early as 10,000 years ago, the Tahltan First Nations people, who now live in Dease Lake, Telegraph Creek and the Iskut, used obsidian from the Mount Edziza volcanic complex to make tools and weapons for trading material. This is the main source of obsidian found in northwestern British Columbia, which was traded as far away as Alaska and northern Alberta. Obsidian is a type of naturally occurring glass that is highly valued for its cutting qualities and is produced by the rapid cooling of lava. Like all glass and some other types of naturally occurring rocks, obsidian breaks with a characteristic conchoidal fracture, creating razor sharp edges. A knife made of Edziza obsidian,  possibly 2,000 years old, has been recovered in the Stikine River area. Two exposed columnar basalt formations exist within the volcanic complex: the Tahltan Eagle at the meeting of the Tahltan and Stikine rivers, and Pipe Organ Mountain. The Tahltan Eagle has significant spiritual and cultural importance to the Tahltan people, while the correct name and cultural significance of Pipe Organ Mountain to the Tahltan people is unknown.

Geologic studies

This area of long-lived volcanic activity has been studied and mapped in detail for many years by geoscientists. The first detail studying and mapping of the Mount Edziza volcanic complex was accomplished in the early 1970s by a Geological Survey of Canada society led by Canadian scientist Jack Souther. Edziza was a significant study area by Souther. While mapping, Souther looked at a mineral tenure map of Stikine Country and was surprised to see that many of the small cinder cones in the area had been maintained by mineral tenures. Upon investigation, the staking had been completed for the British Columbia Railway, then under construction to Dease Lake. The staking was designed to provide a ready source of weight for the railway bed. The Geological Survey of Canada agreed to support a series of Canada-wide lectures by Jack Souther to establish the Mount Edziza Provincial Park to protect the Mount Edziza volcanic complex. Coincidentally, Jack Souther had an opportunity to examine the Red Dog (Spectrum) property gold veins and he accomplished several section studies of specimens. It was not Souther's intention to include in the park any of the mineralization within near-surface older rocks.

Souther's studies in 1992 highlighted the importance and size of the region, and proposed that numerous subglacial eruptions emplaced lava in a sub-ice or ice-contact environment. More recent studies have worked on Souther's contributions with more detailed studies which are funded by colleges and universities. Since colleges and universities started studying the Mount Edziza volcanic complex, it has been an extremely important volcano for subglacial volcanism because its ice-contact lavas record evidence of ice existence and thickness in an area for which there is very little data on ice conditions before the Illinoian Stage of glaciation, which preceded the last glacial, or "Wisconsin", period. Several areas of possible basaltic and trachytic ice-contact products were studied in detail on the western flank of the Mount Edziza volcanic complex, in order to approve their ice-contact nature, and to eventually better constrain former ice existence and thickness. Its lava plateau has also been an important cultural resource. In 2006, Jeff Hungerford, a student of the University of Pittsburgh in Carlisle, Pennsylvania, United States, focused on fieldwork on the region surrounding Edziza's Tennena Cone, located immediately west of Ice Peak which formed subglacially during the early Holocene period when this area had remnants of glacial ice from the last ice age. Hungerford's studies in 2006 focused on subglacial volcanism, sampling pillow lavas to be used for degassing studies aimed at determining ice thicknesses during a subglacial eruption, and describing coeval glaciogenic sediments immediately underlying pillow lavas at the distal end of the lava flows. Hungerford also worked on describing glaciogenic sediments immediately underlying lava flows from Ice Peak adjacent to Tennena Cone, which may preserve a record of a one-million-year-old ice sheet.

Kristen LaMoreaux, another student of the University of Pittsburgh, focused on the emplacement of trachyte lava flows and domes. In 2006, LaMoreaux analyzed jointing patterns at Ornostay Bluff, a viscous series of trachyte lava flows on the western lava plateau of the Mount Edziza volcanic complex. LaMoreaux also examined trachytic lava flows from Koosick Bluff and Triangle Dome, a trachytic lava dome which last erupted during the Pleistocene period. Other studies by LaMoreaux determined criteria for understanding how lava flow thickness may or may not be an indication that the progress of a lava flow was impeded by an ice barrier, resulting in an unusually thick lava flow.

Chira Endress, a student of Dickinson College in Carlisle, Pennsylvania, United States, focused on a section of glaciogenic sediments immediately beneath the same Ice Peak trachyte lava flow sampled and described by Jeff Hungerford during his 2006 studies. Endress attempted to determine if the sediments were deposited immediately before the lava flow was emplaced, or if they are likely to be much older. Endress has quantified the mineralogy of clasts and sand-sized particles from samples in the sediment, and has determined that the mineralogy of several of the trachytic clasts is very similar to that in the overlying lava flow, including the minerals clinopyroxene, magnetite, alkali feldspar, and aenigmatite. Endress has also found small lenses of pristine basaltic glass, which could have derived from the Pillow Ridge subglacial mound near Mount Edziza.

Alexander S. Lloyd, a student of Dickinson College, focused on the cooling rates of pillow lavas. Lloyd studied in detail the variation in crystal sizes from the edge pristine pillow lava, which could have derived from nearby Pillow Ridge which last erupted during the Pleistocene period.

Courtney Haynes, another student of Dickinson College, focused on mathematics of the pillow lavas in 2007.

Monitoring
Currently the Mount Edziza volcanic complex is not monitored closely enough by the Geological Survey of Canada to ascertain how active the volcano's magma system is. The existing network of seismographs has been established to monitor tectonic earthquakes and is too far away to provide a good indication of what is happening beneath the volcanic complex. The network may sense an increase in activity if the volcano becomes very restless, but this may only provide a warning for a large eruption. It might detect activity only once the volcano has started erupting.

A possible way to detect an eruption is studying Edziza's geological history since every volcano has its own pattern of behavior, in terms of its eruption style, magnitude and frequency, so that its future eruption is expected to be similar to its previous eruptions.

While there is a likelihood of Canada being critically affected by local or close by volcanic eruptions argues that some kind of improvement program is required. Benefit-cost thoughts are critical to dealing with natural hazards. However, a benefit-cost examination needs correct data about the hazard types, magnitudes and occurrences. These do not exist for volcanoes in British Columbia or elsewhere in Canada in the detail required.

Other volcanic techniques, such as hazard mapping, displays a volcano's eruptive history in detail and speculates an understanding of the hazardous activity that could possibly be expected in the future. A large volcanic hazard program has never existed within the Geological Survey of Canada. The information has been collected in a lengthy, separate way from the support of several employees, such as volcanologists and other geologic scientists. Current knowledge is best established at the Mount Meager massif in the Garibaldi Volcanic Belt of southwestern British Columbia and is likely to rise considerably with a temporary mapping and monitoring project. Knowledge at the Mount Edziza volcanic complex and other volcanoes in the Northern Cordilleran Volcanic Province is not as established, but certain contributions are being done at least Mount Cayley, another volcano in the Garibaldi Volcanic Belt. An intensive program classifying infrastructural exposure near all young Canadian volcanoes and quick hazard assessments at each individual volcanic edifice associated with recent seismic activity would be in advance and would produce a quick and productive determination of priority areas for further efforts.

The existing network of seismographs to monitor tectonic earthquakes has existed since 1975, although it remained small in population until 1985. Apart from a few short-term seismic monitoring experiments by the Geological Survey of Canada, no volcano monitoring has been accomplished at the Mount Edziza volcanic complex or at other volcanoes in Canada at a level approaching that in other established countries with historically active volcanoes. Such monitoring detects the risk of an eruption, offering a forecasting capability which is important to mitigating volcanic risk. With increasing distance and declining numbers of seismographs used to indicate seismic activity, the prediction capability is reduced because earthquake location accuracy and depth decreases, and the network becomes less accurate. At carefully monitored volcanoes both the located and noticed events are recorded and surveyed immediately to improve the understanding of a future eruption.

In countries like Canada it is possible that small precursor earthquake swarms might go undetected, particularly if no events were observed; more significant events in larger swarms would be detected but only a minor subdivision of the swarm events would be complex to clarify them with confidence as volcanic in nature, or even associate them with an individual volcanic edifice.

See also

Geology of the Pacific Northwest
List of mountain peaks of North America
List of Northern Cordilleran volcanoes
List of volcanoes in Canada
Mountain peaks of Canada
Volcanology of Canada
Volcanology of Western Canada

References

External links
Volcanoes of Canada Stikine Volcanic Belt (Mount Edziza area)
Catalogue of Canadian volcanoes – Mount Edziza

 
Stratovolcanoes of Canada
Shield volcanoes of Canada
Lava domes
Calderas of British Columbia
Stikine Country
Active volcanoes
Lava plateaus
Miocene volcanoes
Pliocene volcanoes
Pleistocene volcanoes
Polygenetic volcanoes
Hot springs of British Columbia
Northern Cordilleran Volcanic Province
Tahltan Highland
Lava fields
Polygenetic shield volcanoes